Reduviasporonites or Tympanicysta are palynomorphs — microfossils which appear to be fungal or algal cells or spores.  They were first described from specimens found in the Flowerpot Formation by  L. R. Wilson in 1962.  That first paper conjectured that they were a type of Penicillium fungus.  Another analysis suggested that they might have been algal.  They have been classified as phragmospores, having cell walls in a ladder-like formation. 

They are of interest as possible evidence for a spike in fungal abundance associated with the Permian–Triassic extinction event.

References

Fossil taxa described in 1962